, founded as , was a Japanese adult video (AV) production company. In early 2011, they were integrated with the AV company KM Produce.

Company information
The company was founded under the name Cosmos Plan on October 13, 1981 making it, along with h.m.p (then known as Samm) and Tadashi Yoyogi's Athena Eizou, one of Japan's pioneering AV companies. The studio's first video, starring Emi Nakamura, was released in December 1981. The video, directed by pink film director Genji Nakamura, who later made an early gay pink film Beautiful Mystery, was one of earliest of the modern style adult videos. Soon afterward the studio also released one of the first S&M adult videos, . In 1982,  starring Michiko Miura broke new ground in AV with its documentary style, including an interview with the shy actress, a format still being used for debut videos of featured actresses. The studio's success was assured with a series of popular  videos in the following years. Among the early stars of the studio was Keiko Nakazawa who made her AV debut for Cosmos Plan in December 1985 with the video . The studio added a new label, Bazooka, in August 1989.

In 1990, as its business expanded into other areas, the company changed its name to Media Station but continued to produce videos under the Cosmos Plan label. 
In the later 1990s a number of future AV Idols made their debuts with the company, including Madoka Ozawa in 1996, Bunko Kanazawa and Sally Yoshino in 1997, and Minori Aoi in 1999. Kanazawa would go on to make more videos with the company than any other actress.

By at least 1997, Cosmos Plan and a number of the other older AV companies including Alice Japan, Atlas21, Max-A and Big Morkal had gathered around Kuki Inc. to pool resources and use the X CITY website for sales and video on-demand, together forming the largest porn conglomerate in Japan at that time. In late 2007, the company, with headquarters in Shibuya, Tokyo, had capital of 20 million yen (about $200,000) and reported sales for the fiscal year 2005 of 1.5 billion yen (about $15 million). In earlier years sales figures had totalled 1.6 billion yen for fiscal year 2000 and 1.9 billion yen for 2002 and 2003.

Media Station was affiliated with AV manufacturers KMP and Real Works, and the Media Station website, home.uchu.co.jp, was operated by KMP. In mid-2010 Media Station was releasing about 10 videos per month under its labels Cosmos Plan (with codes beginning with MDS) and Bazooka (with codes beginning MDB).

However, by April 2011, the Media Station website announced that Cosmos Plan had been integrated into the KMP website and from February 2011, the Cosmos and Bazooka labels were incorporated into KMP.

Labels
In addition to the Cosmos Plan label, the company has also issued videos under the following label names:

 Bazooka
 Bijin
 Exert
 Pix
 Raiden
 Stylish

Actresses
A number of prominent AV Idols have performed in Media Station videos:

 Hotaru Akane
 Minori Aoi
 Ami Ayukawa
 Hitomi Hayasaka
 Yumika Hayashi
 Honoka
 Bunko Kanazawa
 Yuri Komuro
 Meguru Kosaka
 Aika Miura
 Nozomi Momoi
 Alice Ogura
 Nao Oikawa
 Asami Sugiura
 Riko Tachibana
 Akira Watase
 Sally Yoshino

Series
Media Station series include:
 Angel
 Fallen Angel X (堕天使Ｘ)
 Love Letter (ラブレター)
 Nurse Club (ナース倶楽部)
 Obscene MAX (猥褻ＭＡＸ)
 Princess Butt (尻姫)
 The Goddess of Soapland (ソープの女神さま)
 Venus Style
 Wet Diary (おしめり手帖)

Awards
Media Station was one of the companies associated with Kuki and the X City website which participated in the X City Adult Video Grand Prix Awards. At the 2001 X City Grand Prix Awards, the studio took the Best Video Title Award for Small Girls' Fuck (starring Sayaka Tsutsumi) on their Bazooka label. At the 2002 awards, the Bazooka label again won the Best Video Title Award for their popular Fallen Angel X series.

In 2004 the company took another award, the Best AV Title, at the 5th Takeshi Kitano Awards in 2004 for their video Faithful Pooch Saseko.

References

Sources
 

Japanese pornographic film studios
Film production companies of Japan
Mass media companies established in 1981
Mass media companies based in Tokyo
1981 establishments in Japan